Bongaree is a suburb of Bribie Island in Moreton Bay Region, Queensland, Australia. It is located on the western side of Bribie Island, adjacent to the Pumicestone Passage.

Geography 

Bongaree is on the south-western corner of Bribie Island and sits at the northern end of Moreton Bay. The Bribie Island Bridge links the most north-westerly point of Bongaree across the Pumicestone Passage to Sandstone Point on the mainland and is the only bridge to a Moreton Bay Island.

The southern part of the locality is within the Buckleys Hole Conservation Park. The park is approx  with a variety of landscapes, including a freshwater lagoon, awoodland, an open forest and a beach. It is popular with bushwalkers and anglers.

History 

The suburb is named after the Aboriginal explorer Bungaree who accompanied Matthew Flinders on a number of his voyages of exploration of the Australian coastline.

In 1891, a school opened at the  Bribie Island Aboriginal Mission.

A provisional school opened in 1908 but closed in 1909.

In 1923, first Methodist church services were held under a gum tree at the site of the current bowls club. In 1924 land was purchased in Banya Street and in 1929 a church building from Enoggera was relocated to the site. The church was officially opened on Saturday 27 December 1930. By the mid 1970s the church was becoming too small for the congregation and land was purchased in Webster Street. On 27 July 1986 the new Bribie Island Unting Church in Webster Street was officially opened.

Bribie Island Provisional School opened on 4 February 1924. On 16 Feb 1925 it became Bribie Island State School.

In April 1927, Anglican residents of Bribie Island decided to build a church in honour of St Peter the fisherman. On Sunday 7 October 1928 Dean Batty performed the stump capping ceremony. On Thursday 27 December 1928 the church was dedicated by Archbishop Gerald Sharp. In 1974 the church was  re-positioned and renovated and was re-dedicated on 5 May 1974 by Archbishop Felix Arnott. By 1989 it was decided that the growing congregation needed a new larger church building. The new church of St Peter Apostle & Martyr was dedicated on 24 May 2008 by Archbishop Phillip Aspinall and consecrated by him on 5 November 2016.

The journey took four weeks and involved seven men with winches, trucks and semi-trailers. Coward's son Flying Officer Charles G.T. Coward was killed on active service  in the Royal Australian Air Force on 23 November 1943 aged 21 years. Before leaving Australia, Coward's son had said "If anything happens to me, Dad, buy me a church". On Thursday 1 January 1948, the church was officially opened by Archbishop James Duhig. A statue of St Michael, the warrior saint, was erected over the sanctuary to commemorate the deaths of Flying Officer Coward and his friend Flight-Lieutenant Virgil Paul Brennan who died on active service on 13 June 1943 aged 23 years.

The Bribie Bridge was constructed from 1961 to 1963 and was officially opened on 19 October 1963 by Queensland Premier Frank Nicklin. The bridge was a toll bridge from its opening in 1963 until 1975. The toll for crossing was 5 shillings.

The Bribie Island library opened at Bongaree in 1976 with a major refurbishment in 2016.

The foundation stone of Bribie Island Uniting Church was laid on Sunday 4 May 1986 by Raymond F. Hunt, Moderator of the Queensland Synod.

Bribie Island State High School opened on 23 January 1989.

Bribie Christian Outreach Centre opened in July 2003.

The population was 53.4% female and 46.6% male. The median age of the Bongaree population was 62 years, 25 years above the national median of 37. Children under 15 years made up 9.4% of the population and people aged 65 years and over made up 44.8% of the population. 74% of people living in Bongaree were born in Australia. The other top responses for country of birth were England 7.1%, New Zealand 4.1%, Scotland 1%, Netherlands 0.9%, Germany 0.6%. 90.9% of people spoke only English at home; the next most common languages were 0.4% German, 0.3% Dutch, 0.2% Croatian, 0.2% Italian, 0.2% Thai.

Bribie Island Seaside Museum opened on 14 May 2010.

Education 
Bribie Island State School is a government primary (Prep-6) school for boys and girls at 31-63 First Avenue. In 2018, the school had an enrolment of 647 students with 43 teachers (39 full-time equivalent) and 30 non-teaching staff (22 full-time equivalent). It includes a special education program.

Bribie Island State High School is a government secondary (7-12) school for boys and girls at 65-101 First Avenue. In 2018, the school had an enrolment of 1,189 students with 97 teachers (93 full-time equivalent) and 39 non-teaching staff (34 full-time equivalent). It includes a special education program.

Amenities 

The Moreton Bay Regional Council operates the Bribie Island Library at 1 Welsby Parade.

St Peter's Anglican Church is at 10 Banya Street (corner Foster Street). It hold services on Sundays and Wednesdays.

The Little Flower Catholic Church is at 41-47 First Avenue.

Bribie Island Uniting Church is at 76-82 Webster Street.

Bribie Island Baptist Church is at 7-9 Cotterill Avenue.

Bribie Island Church of Christ is at 42 Foley Street. The congregation commenced in 1975.

Bribie Christian Outreach Centre (also known as the Awesome Bribie Island Church) is at 7/1 Toorbul Street. It is part of the International Network of Churches.

Attractions

Bribie Island Seaside Museum is at 1 South Esplanade.

References

External links 

 

Suburbs of Moreton Bay Region
Bribie Island